György Kozmann (born March 23, 1978 in Szekszárd) is a Hungarian sprint canoeist who competed since the late 1990s. Competing in two Summer Olympics, he won two bronze medals in the C-2 1000 m event, earning them in 2004 and 2008.

He has also won eleven medals at the ICF Canoe Sprint World Championships with five golds (C-2 500 m: 2007, C-2 1000 m: 2006, C-4 200 m: 2001, 2003, C-4 1000 m: 2001), two silvers (C-2 500 m: 2005, C-4 500 m: 2001), and four bronzes (C-2 500 m: 2006, C-2 1000 m: 2003, 2005; C-4 1000 m: 1999). From 2003 until 2008, he was the C-2 partner of György Kolonics.

In the European championships Kozmann has been a gold medalist four times - C-4 500 m (2002), C-4 1000 m (2000 and 2002) and C-2 500 m (2004).

Kolonics death came weeks prior to the 2008 Olympics, to what the pair qualified for both the C-2 500 m and the C-2 1000 m events. Kozmann refused to take part in the games, consulted with his coach, friends and Kolonics's friends, then changed his mind. He competed in the C-2 1000 m event with Tamás Kiss, and the pair finished on the third place in the C-2 1000 m final. He later received a Fair Play prize for this from the Hungarian Olympic Committee.

Kozmann is a member of the Atomerőmű SE club and is coached by Attila Szabó. He is 179 cm (5'10") tall and weighs 83 kg (182 lbs).

References

External links
 
 

1978 births
Canoeists at the 2004 Summer Olympics
Canoeists at the 2008 Summer Olympics
Hungarian male canoeists
Olympic canoeists of Hungary
Olympic bronze medalists for Hungary
Living people
Olympic medalists in canoeing
ICF Canoe Sprint World Championships medalists in Canadian
Medalists at the 2008 Summer Olympics
Medalists at the 2004 Summer Olympics
People from Szekszárd
Sportspeople from Tolna County
21st-century Hungarian people